Ray Paczkowski is a keyboardist from Burlington, Vermont. He graduated from a Chatham, Massachusetts high school.  A former milkman, Ray is part of the Jazz trio Vorcza, but is best known for playing in various bands with Phish guitarist Trey Anastasio.

Bands
 Vorcza
 Viperhouse - 1996—2000
 The Octet — 2001
 Trey Anastasio Band - 2001—present
 The Dectet — 2002—2004
 Dave Matthews & Friends — 2003—2006
 70 Volt Parade — 2005
 Soule Monde - 2011—present

References

Year of birth missing (living people)
Living people
Musicians from Burlington, Vermont
21st-century American keyboardists